Dausara marginalis is a moth in the family Crambidae. It was described by Frederic Moore in 1877. It is found in India (the Andamans) and Western New Guinea, Indonesia.

The basal two-thirds of the forewings is hyaline (glass like) white and the remaining area is purplish pearly. There is a bronze band from the costa to the inner margin at the basal third, as well as a bronze spot at the end of the cell. The costa is brown bordered.

References

Moths described in 1877
Odontiinae